Alf Christian Tveten (30 July 1912 – 13 July 1997) was a Norwegian sailor who competed in the 1936 Summer Olympics.

In 1936 he won the silver medal as crew member of the Norwegian boat Lully II in the 6 metre class event.

External links
Alf Tveten's olympic profile

1912 births
1997 deaths
Norwegian male sailors (sport)
Olympic sailors of Norway
Olympic silver medalists for Norway
Sailors at the 1936 Summer Olympics – 6 Metre
Olympic medalists in sailing

Medalists at the 1936 Summer Olympics